Stenelytrana is a genus of beetles in the family Cerambycidae, containing the following species:

 Stenelytrana bonaerensis (Burmeister, 1865)
 Stenelytrana emarginata (Fabricius, 1787)
 Stenelytrana gigas (LeConte, 1873)
 Stenelytrana splendens (Knull, 1935)

References

Lepturinae